The Orlando Fantasy were a women's American football in the Lingerie Football League that began playing in the 2010–11 season and based in Orlando, Florida.

Initially, former Orlando Predators' quarterback Ben Bennett was named head coach, but resigned due to disagreements with league management. He was replaced by the Predators' defensive specialist Kenny McEntyre. McEntyre was also replaced before the season started by Predators' assistant coach Doug Miller. The team played their two home games at UCF Arena.

In 2011, the team changed home venues and moved outdoors to the Florida Citrus Bowl. Following the team's final game of the 2011–12 season, head coach Miller was fired for behavioral infractions and playing running back Etta Paul after she had sustained a concussion. The team was suspended in May 2012 and never returned.

2010–11 roster

Seasons

2010–11 schedule

2011–12 schedule

References 

Legends Football League US teams
American football teams in Florida
American football teams in Orlando, Florida
American football teams established in 2010
American football teams disestablished in 2013
2010 establishments in Florida
2013 disestablishments in Florida